The splendid poison frog  (Oophaga speciosa) is an extinct species of poison dart frog that was endemic to the eastern end of Cordillera de Talamanca, western Panama. Its natural habitats are humid lowland and montane forests.

Conservation status
Mullerian mimicry was a natural phenomenon that played a pivotal role in the conservation of the splendid poison tree frog. The splendid poison tree frog closely resembled the strawberry poison frog which provided a great deal of protection from predators for both species. The species was formerly common, but its present population status is poorly known. It is now classified as extinct.

References

External links

speciosa
Amphibians of Panama
Endemic fauna of Panama
Amphibians described in 1857
Taxonomy articles created by Polbot
Talamancan montane forests